Boparan may refer to:

 Boparan Holdings, holding company owned by Ranjit Singh Boparan
 Ranjit Singh Boparan (born 1966), British businessman